Hava Dul (also Romanized as Havā Dūl) is a village in Majin Rural District, Majin District, Darreh Shahr County, Ilam Province, Iran. At the 2006 census, its population was 38, in 6 families. The village is populated by Lurs.

References 

Populated places in Darreh Shahr County
Luri settlements in Ilam Province